Joseph Fahys & Co is a watchmaker headquartered in New York. It was founded in 1857 by Joseph Fahys, a French emigrant.

Joseph Fahys & Co is most famous for their production of the Dust Proof Case and the Magnetically Shielded Case during the 1880s. The company’s handmade gold and silver watches are sought after and highly collectible today. In 2013, Joseph Fahys & Co began developing a luxury American-made smartwatch with a patent pending kinetically charged battery.

History

The founder of the company, Joseph Fahys, was born on May 28, 1832 in Belfort, France. In 1848, Fahys emigrated from France to the United States with his mother. He was apprenticed to Ulysses Savoye, of West Hoboken, New Jersey, who was one of the two first watch case makers in the United States. He remained Savoye’s employee for five years until beginning an independent career at the age of 21. 
In 1857, Fahys had earned enough to be able to buy Savoye’s business and he renamed it: Joseph Fahys & Co. He initially moved the business to 75 Nassau Street in Lower Manhattan, but later relocated the factory back to Carlstadt, New Jersey
By 1867, the company had expanded and a second factory was opened in Brooklyn. Shortly after, Fahys relocated the original plant to Sag Harbor, Long Island. It has been suggested that Fahys was able to move to this location only as a result of the socio-economic changes brought about by the Great Fire of Sag Harbor in 1877. 
The business was officially incorporated in 1881, when Fahys went into partnership with his son-in-law Henry Francis Cook. The watch plant in Sag Harbor was titled ‘The Fahys Watch Case Co.’, while the firm in New York remained under the name ‘Joseph Fahys & Co.’ The corporation absorbed the Brooklyn Watch Case Company and the Alvin Manufacturing Company of New Jersey. During this time, the company not only manufactured watchcases but was also the biggest producer of silverware in the United States. Fahys used his influence and success to found the Jewellers Board of Trade in 1884, and was the first president of the Watchcase Manufacturers Association.
During the latter part of the 19th Century, the company was the largest manufacturer of gold and silver watch cases in the United States. Fahys’ watch factory in Sag Harbor created an immediate demand for manual as well as skilled labor. A large proportion of its laborers were retired seamen and immigrants. Historian Helen Gerard notes:

“Recruiters from the factory went directly to Ellis Island…and offered the immigrants jobs. Whole families would transfer to the steamer going directly to Sag Harbor without ever setting foot in New York”. The factory was said to have sported a social hall with billiards room and card tables, and a library.

Fahys employed a high number of Hungarian, Polish and Italian workers, many of whom were expert engravers.  The company earned a reputation for providing excellent working conditions and benefits for its employees
At the height of its success, it was reported that the Sag Harbor factory required $6,000 (around $350,000 in 2015) worth of gold to be melted down each day to produce its wares.  During the Great Depression, Joseph Fahys & Co. suffered just as many other businesses who produced ‘luxury items’ did. Under growing financial strain Fahys sold the Sag Harbor plant to Joseph Bulova, an Austrian watchmaker who continued to produce watchcases in the factory until 1975.

Present day

In 2013, under new leadership Joseph Fahys & Co. began development on their luxury smartwatch, the In-Touch. In-Touch will feature the finest materials and be assembled to an exacting standard in New York.

What makes the In-Touch unique is its patent pending technology that uses a kinetic generator to charge the battery as the user moves their wrists. This will enable the user to use the watch for up to 72 hours without needing to be charged via power supply. The In-Touch will be released early 2017 and will cost around $1,600.

Mechanical watches
Since 1857 all Fahys watchcases have been fitted with high quality mechanical movements. The cases were made of gold, silver and oresilver (nickel) and Fahys' goods were acknowledged by the entire trade to be unequaled in their strength and workmanship.
During the mid-1880s, Joseph Fahys & Co marketed a range of Dust Proof Cases which were resistant to dirt and water. One of their adverts of the time proclaimed “Water won’t hurt it!” This was a bold statement at the time. 
In the late 1880s, there was a growing concern about the risk of watchcases becoming magnetized. To answer such concerns, Fahys utilised the Giles Anti-Magnetic Shield in order to release a range of magnetically shielded cases. 
Joseph Fahys & Co manufactured a variety of shapes of watches. Fahys gave some of these styles unique names, for example: the Raleigh, the Boston, the Olympia and the Cambridge. The company also offered a range of engraved styles ranging from Locomotive designs to Ships of the Spanish–American War. The company also produced bracelet watches. 
At the height of production during the First World War, Joseph Fahys & Co. also produced a series of silver trench watch cases that housed Marvin A. Cattin and Imperial Branded movements.

Smart watches

 In development since 2014, Joseph Fahys & Co will release the In-Touch luxury smartwatch which will be the first to feature an integrated kinetic generator. The In-Touch will be available in Stainless Steel, 14K Rose Gold, Platinum and Black PVD Stainless Steel cases with a vulcanized rubber strap and deployment buckle. It will feature the most advanced technological specs including: Corning Gorilla Glass SR+, Qualcomm Snapdragon Wear 2100 processor, 1 GB RAM with a fully circular AMOLED display with 10,000:1 high contrast ratio. The In-Touch will be waterproof to 50 meters / 164 feet.  Yehuda Fulda, Chairman of the Board said "The In-Touch is a technological tour de force on your wrist, reflecting years of research and design, it's - a luxury watch you will be proud to wear in any setting". The In-Touch will be assembled in New York.

Factories and offices
After purchasing the business from his mentor and renaming it Joseph Fahys & Co, Fahys moved the watch plant from Hoboken, New Jersey to New York. Shortly after, however, he relocated the factory again to Carlstadt, New Jersey. A second factory was opened in 1867 in Brooklyn.

Early in 1880, Fahys met with the Sag Harbor Business Aid Committee, and the New York Times later reported the selection of Sag Harbor as the future site of a new watchcase factory, stating, “Plans furnished by John A. Wood called for two main buildings 200 feet in length, three stories high, and connected by a 100-foot structure. Five separate buildings, each one story high, would be constructed to house a blacksmith shop, boiler, engine rooms and rooms for annealing and smelting silver and gold. They would be constructed of brick and granite trim, have stone floor and roofs of tin, making them absolutely fireproof. Steam would be used for heating and gas for lighting, which would be manufactured on the premises. A vault 10 x 13 feet, made of 1-1/2-foot granite blocks, would be installed in the main building, and a high fence would surround the entire place.”. The factory was said to have sported a social hall with billiards room and card tables, and a library. 
The relocation of the factory led to a housing boom in Sag Harbor, with approximately 80 small factory workers’ houses being built to accommodate the new workers. The factory building itself has been labelled as “Gradgrind" architecture, a name inspired by an inflexible, dictatorial Dickens character. Wilfrid Sheed in ‘Sag Harbor Is: A Literary Celebration’  said that the building was “one of those epic anomalies that help to define a landscape by clashing with it

Approximately 1,000 workers were employed between the Sag Harbor and Brooklyn factories at the height of the company’s success. In 1925, much of the Sag Harbor factory was destroyed by fire. By 1931, amidst the financial pressures of Great Depression, the factory was closed. In 1937, Joseph Bulova, an Austrian watchmaker, took a ten-year lease on the building, and later bought it. Bulova operated the factory until 1975, when the plant was closed due to increased overseas competition and a changing marketplace.  In 2014, the abandoned factory was redeveloped into a luxury complex consisting of condominiums, penthouses and townhouses named ‘The Watchcase’

Whilst the Fahys factories have been in various locations, the offices have always been New York based. The offices were first based at 75 Nassau Street until 1861, when they moved to 9 Maiden Lane, then to 38 Maiden Lane and then to 41 Maiden Lane. In 1896 the Fahys building at 54 Maiden Lane, running through to Liberty Street, was built and the offices and showrooms were relocated there

In 2015 Joseph Fahys & Co moved its headquarters to the iconic Empire State Building in New York City.

References

Watch brands
Watch manufacturing companies of the United States
Manufacturing companies based in New York City
Companies based in Manhattan
American companies established in 1857
Manufacturing companies established in 1857
1857 establishments in New York (state)